Skyles Creek is a stream in the U.S. state of West Virginia.

Skyles Creek was named after a government surveyor.

See also
List of rivers of West Virginia

References

Rivers of Braxton County, West Virginia
Rivers of Webster County, West Virginia
Rivers of West Virginia